Gustáv Murín (1959) is a Slovak author and journalist. He has written critically on corruption in Slovak politics. His Small World was published in France as Le monde est petit. He was president of the PEN centre of Slovakia 2000 – 2004, 2009 – 2011.

Novels
 1989 Případ pohřbeného hřbitova 
 1990 Leto praje milencom
 1990 Návraty zo svetla
 1998 Ako sa máš
 1998 Zvieratá, ja a iné 
 2005 Svet je malý / Le monde est petit  
 2010 Návrat do budúcnosti
 2015 Volajú ma Žaluď – …a ešte ma nedostali

References

1959 births
Living people
Slovak journalists
Slovak writers